Chau Chin-fu (born 28 October 1952) is a Taiwanese judoka. He competed in the men's extra-lightweight event at the 1984 Summer Olympics.

References

1952 births
Living people
Taiwanese male judoka
Olympic judoka of Taiwan
Judoka at the 1984 Summer Olympics
Place of birth missing (living people)